"At Midnight (My Love Will Lift You Up)" is a hit song by R&B/funk band Rufus featuring Chaka Khan in 1977. Released from their hit album, Ask Rufus, it spent two weeks at number one on the Hot Soul Singles chart and peaked at number thirty on the Billboard Hot 100 singles chart.

Chart positions

References

1977 singles
Chaka Khan songs
1977 songs
ABC Records singles